This is a list of mayors of Pittsfield, Massachusetts. Pittsfield became a city in 1891.

References

Pittsfield